Plum Grove is a city in Liberty County, Texas, United States. The population was 1,245 at the 2020 census.

Geography

Plum Grove is located at  (30.207185, –95.091518).

Demographics

As of the census of 2000, there were 930 people, 284 households, and 230 families residing in the city. The population density was 127.2 people per square mile (49.1/km). There were 314 housing units at an average density of 42.9 per square mile (16.6/km). The racial makeup of the city was 91.29% White, 0.75% African American, 0.32% Native American, 0.22% Asian, 5.38% from other races, and 2.04% from two or more races. Hispanic or Latino of any race were 8.60% of the population.

There were 284 households, out of which 50.4% had children under the age of 18 living with them, 69.0% were married couples living together, 6.0% had a female householder with no husband present, and 18.7% were non-families. 15.8% of all households were made up of individuals, and 4.2% had someone living alone who was 65 years of age or older. The average household size was 3.27 and the average family size was 3.65.

In the city, the population was spread out, with 36.1% under the age of 18, 9.7% from 18 to 24, 33.2% from 25 to 44, 16.8% from 45 to 64, and 4.2% who were 65 years of age or older. The median age was 28 years. For every 100 females, there were 111.8 males. For every 100 females age 18 and over, there were 104.8 males.

The median income for a household in the city was $42,232, and the median income for a family was $44,792. Males had a median income of $38,182 versus $21,250 for females. The per capita income for the city was $12,917. About 10.8% of families and 12.7% of the population were below the poverty line, including 14.4% of those under age 18 and 5.9% of those age 65 or over.

Education
Plum Grove is served by the Cleveland Independent School District.

References

External links

Cities in Liberty County, Texas
Cities in Texas
Greater Houston